John Sigsbee Rees Shad (June 27, 1923 – July 7, 1994), served as chairman of U.S. Securities and Exchange Commission between 1981 and 1987. He also served as the ambassador to the Netherlands.  He earned degrees from the University of Southern California, the Harvard Business School and the New York University Law School.

He said when he was the head of the SEC that he had wanted to spend a third of his life learning, a third earning, and a third serving.

He had two children, Leslie Shad and Rees Shad, and was married to Patricia Shad.

Legacy
  Shad Hall, at Harvard Business School, was named for him; in 1987, Shad had provided a $20 million endowment to the school for a "Business Leadership and Ethics" program.

John S.R. Shad papers at Baker Library Special Collections, Harvard Business School.

References

|-

Members of the U.S. Securities and Exchange Commission
1923 births
1994 deaths
Ambassadors of the United States to the Netherlands
Harvard Business School alumni
New York University School of Law alumni
University of Southern California alumni
Reagan administration personnel